Alexander Bell Donald (18 August 1842–7 March 1922) was a New Zealand seaman, sailmaker, merchant and ship owner. He was born in Inverkeithing, Fife, Scotland on 18 August 1842.

References

1842 births
1922 deaths
Scottish emigrants to New Zealand
People from Inverkeithing